Libanius was a teacher of rhetoric of the Sophist school in the Eastern Roman Empire. His prolific writings make him one of the best documented teachers of higher education in the ancient world and a critical source of history of the Greek East during the 4th century AD. During the rise of Christian hegemony in the later Roman Empire, he remained unconverted and in religious matters was a pagan Hellene.

Life
Libanius was born in Antioch, located near the modern-day city of Antakya, Turkey. He was born into a deeply cultured and once-influential family that had experienced substantial recent decline. In 303 AD, eleven years before his birth, his family had participated in resisting an insurrection by a local army garrison. In the end, Roman Imperial authorities were equally concerned by local aristocrats arming themselves as they were by the rebellious troops. Libanius' family fell out of favor and his grandfather was executed. Libanius' father died when he was eleven, leaving his upbringing to his mother and maternal uncles, who were in the process of rebuilding his family's reputation.

At fourteen years old he began his study of rhetoric, for which he withdrew from public life and devoted himself to philosophy. Unfamiliar with Latin literature, he deplored its influence.

He studied in Athens under Diophantus the Arab and began his career in Constantinople as a private tutor. He was exiled to Nicomedia in 346 (or earlier) for around five years but returned to Constantinople and taught there until 354. Before his exile, Libanius was a friend of the emperor Julian, with whom some correspondence survives, and in whose memory he wrote a series of orations; they were composed between 362 and 365. In 354 he accepted the chair of rhetoric in Antioch, his birthplace, where he stayed until his death. His pupils included both pagans and Christians.

Libanius used his arts of rhetoric to advance various private and political causes. He attacked the increasing imperial pressures on the traditional city-oriented culture that had been supported and dominated by the local upper classes. He is known to have protested against the persecution of pagans in the late Roman Empire. In 386, he appealed without success to emperor Theodosius to prevent the destruction of a temple in Edessa, and pleaded for toleration and the preservation of the temples against the predation of Christian monks, who he claimed:

 
The surviving works of Libanius, which include over 1,600 letters, 64 speeches and 96 progymnasmata (rhetorical exercises), are valuable as a historical source for the changing world of the later 4th century. His oration "A Reply To Aristides On Behalf Of The Dancers" is one of the most important records of Roman concert dance, particularly that immensely popular form known as pantomime. His first Oration I is an autobiographical narrative, first written in 374 and revised throughout his life, a scholar's account that ends as an old exile's private journal. Progymnasma 8 (see below for explanation of a "progymnasma") is an imaginary summation of the prosecution's case again a physician charged with poisoning some of his patients.

Although Libanius was not a Christian his students included such notable Christians as John Chrysostom and Theodore of Mopsuestia. Despite his friendship with the pagan restorationist Emperor Julian he was made an honorary praetorian prefect by the Christian Emperor Theodosius I.

Works 
64 orations in the three fields of oratory: judicial, deliberative and epideictic, both orations as if delivered in public and orations meant to be privately read (aloud) in the study. The two volumes of selections in the Loeb Classical Library devote one volume to Libanius' orations that bear on the emperor Julian, the other on Theodosius; the most famous is his "Lamentation" about the desecration of the temples;
51 , a traditional public-speaking format of Rhetoric in Antiquity, taking set topics with historical and mythological themes (translations into English by e.g. D.A. Russell, "Libanius: Imaginary Speeches"; M. Johansson, "Libanius' Declamations 9 and 10"; 
96  or compositional exercises for students of rhetoric, used in his courses of instruction and widely admired as models of good style;
57  or introductions to Demosthenes' orations (written ), in which he sets them in historical context for the novice reader, without polemics; 
1545 letters have been preserved, more letters than those of Cicero. Some 400 additional letters in Latin were later accepted, purporting to be translations, but a dispassionate examination of the texts themselves shows them to be misattributed or forgeries, by the Italian humanist Francesco Zambeccari in the 15th century. Among his correspondents there was Censorius Datianus.

English editions 
 Scott Bradbury, Selected Letters of Libanius. Liverpool, University Press, 2004. 
Raffaella Cribiore, The School of Libanius in Late Antique Antioch. Princeton: Princeton University Press, 2007. (Includes translation of c. 200 letters dealing with the school and its students. Reviewed in Bryn Mawr Classical Reviews.)
 Margaret E. Molloy: Libanius and the Dancers, Olms-Weidmann, Hildesheim 1996 
 A.F. Norman, Libanius: Selected Works, 2 volumes. Cambridge, Massachusetts: Loeb Classical Library, 1969–1977.
 A.F. Norman, Libanius: Autobiography and Selected Letters, 2 volumes. Cambridge, Massachusetts: Loeb Classical Library, 1993. Reviewed in Bryn Mawr Classical Reviews.)
Lieve Van Hoof, Libanius: a critical introduction (Cambridge University Press, 2014)

References

External links
Libanius: "Funeral Oration on Julian"
Libanius: "16 letters to Julian"
Libanius: "On the temple of Apollo destroyed by fire"
Libanius: "On Nicomedia, destroyed by an earthquake"
Libanius: Oration 30: for the temples
 Centre Libanios, the Libanius Site by P.-L. Malosse, part of CRISES research centre.
Two moral anecdotes from the Progymnasmata: (in English) on the harshness of classical Roman education and an encomium of Thersites
Craig Gibson, translator, Summary of “Libanius, Hypotheses to the Orations of Demosthenes” 
Open source XML version of Libanius' works by the University of Leipzig, at Open Greek & Latin Project

314 births
394 deaths
Late-Roman-era pagans
4th-century writers
4th-century Romans
Ancient Greek rhetoricians
Ancient Greek educators
Ancient Greek writers
 
Roman-era students in Athens
Roman-era Sophists
Roman-era Greeks
Persecution of pagans in the late Roman Empire
Memoirists